Tudor House School is a private, day and boarding, preparatory school for boys and girls at Moss Vale, New South Wales, Australia.

The school is Australia's only preparatory boarding school. It became co-educational in 2017.

Tudor House has a non-selective enrolment policy and currently caters for boys and girls from Kindergarten to year 6, with boarding available for boys and girls in years 3–6.

It is part of The King's School, Parramatta, New South Wales.

History
Established in 1897, Tudor House moved from Sydney to its present rural site in Moss Vale in 1902. The founder, Mr Inman, wanted a school that educated the whole boy.

Campus
Tudor House School is situated on 70 hectares (170 acres) of farming land in the Southern Highlands of New South Wales, about 1.5 hours south of Sydney.

The campus features tree groves and an orchard, dams and creeks, playing ovals, including five cricket ovals, three rugby union fields, and two soccer fields, a 25-metre heated swimming pool, two tennis courts, gymnasium, classrooms for Upper School (Years 4–6) and Lower School (K–Year 3), a boarding house, a school hospital staffed by a registered nurse, and specialist rooms including an art room, woodwork workshop, computer lab, library, music and drama centre.

Notable alumni
Edward Cowan – cricket captain in 1994, played for New South Wales Blues and now Tasmanian Tigers and Australian Cricket Team.
Malcolm Fraser – former Australian Prime Minister
Donald Friend – artist
Robert Klippel – sculptor and artist*
James Packer – (cricket & school captain) – head of the Packer empire, son of Kerry Packer
James W. Lance – neurologist
David Moore, photojournalist, founder of the Australian Centre for Photography.
Patrick White – (dux) – author, Nobel laureate (Literature, 1973)

School facts

The current Enrichment Centre was originally the library. It was presented to the school by Henry and Herbert Horden.

Hugh Gemmell Lamb-Smith (1889–1951), an Australian educator who, as a member of the Second Field Ambulance unit, landed at Anzac Cove on 25 April 1915, taught at Tudor House in the late 1900s; he was a member of the staff of Caulfield Grammar School, both as teacher and administrator, from 1913 to 1951.

The Rifle cup was first presented in 1913 and last presented in 1967.

There is a plaque in the Chapel in the memory of Michael Francis Hore-Lacy (1933–1937) who died on 17 September 1937, at age 10.

In the chapel the Headmasters seat is in memory of Sir John Medley (Headmaster 1931–1938). It was presented by his widow and children.

The Tudor House War Memorial Swimming Pool was officially opened by Lieutenant-General Sir John Northcott on 9 December 1961.

The staircase from the Anderson Building to Meyer has a stained glass window. It was presented by the Alexander family in October 1988.

The Lower School was opened on 4 September 2004 by John Marsden.

A 'games' box in Medley House was presented by Charlie MacDonald (boarder 2004–2005).

The choir at Tudor House once carried a lantern as they left the chapel. Now they carry a cross.

Madame Marie France Goodwin taught at Tudor House School (1994–2004) in the old French room, located on the path under the gym.

The main library desk was donated in memory of Roma Doreen Dixon.

The first head Choristors of Tudor House were C.J.R. Arnott and J.B.C.Egan (1954).

The wall going through the garden next to the hall was built to be a memorial wall but was never finished.

In 2008–09 the Upper School classrooms changed to fully air-conditioned classrooms, with smartboards and new desks, chairs and workrooms. There are currently six classrooms in the Upper School.

In 2010 the boarding house – Medley – began a program of renovation, with open dormitories styled by Richard Allen and developed by Property Overseer Peter Burgoyne. The program includes relics from the past adorning the walls. Technology has also been incorporated with softer downlights and an audio system for each dormitory, allowing for audio books, podcasts and radio.

In 2010 a new library was completed, on the old Meyer House boarding house site. Meyer House was relocated near the tennis court and now operates as a boarding residence for parents.

The new library includes a Scholarship Classroom, Staffroom, Lecture theatre with video conferencing, interactive whiteboards, small cinema, a computer lab and glass throughout connecting the learning environment with the Wilderness space.

The playground courtyard of the Infants area was renovated with a new sandpit, play equipment focusing on concrete pipes, logs and rocks, and a 1953 Vauxhall Ute (donated by Denham Construction).

A new chicken coop was constructed, and the school now enjoys eggs from free-range hens.

In 2011, a new playspace and front of school was initiated with a focus on accessing the academic precinct. This area restores the old Meyer Oval for open play. A sandstone wall was constructed to distinguish the entry to Tudor House.

Over the 2012 Christmas holidays, the old kitchen facilities were totally renovated, providing a boys' cooking classroom alongside the commercial kitchen.

Recently, the school received an upgrade to their shower & toilet facilities for boarders.

See also
List of non-government schools in New South Wales
List of boarding schools
The King's School, Sydney

References

External links
 Tudor House website

Boarding schools in New South Wales
Educational institutions established in 1897
Private primary schools in New South Wales
1897 establishments in Australia
Boys' schools in New South Wales
Junior School Heads Association of Australia Member Schools
Preparatory schools (Commonwealth)
Moss Vale, New South Wales